The 2019 Rother District Council election took place on 2 May 2019 to elect members of Rother District Council in East Sussex, England.

Summary

Election result

|-

Ward results

Bexhill Central

Bexhill Collington

Bexhill Kewhurst

Bexhill Old Town & Worsham

Bexhill Pebsham & St. Michael's

Bexhill Sackville

Bexhill Sidley

Bexhill St. Mark's

Bexhill St. Stephen's

Brede & Udimore

Burwash & The Weald

Catsfield & Crowhurst

Eastern Rother

Hurst Green & Ticehurst

North Battle, Netherfield & Wallington

Northern Rother

Robertsbridge

Rye & Winchelsea

Sedlescombe & Westfield

South Battle & Telham

Southern Rother

By-elections between 2019 and 2023

Eastern Rother by-election
A by-election was held in Eastern Rother on 6 May 2021 after the resignation of Sally-Ann Hart following her election to Parliament in the 2019 general election. The seat was won by Conservative candidate Lizzie Hacking.

References

2019
2019 English local elections
May 2019 events in the United Kingdom
2010s in East Sussex